Ezequiel Antonio Loza Fernández (born 1 October 1976) is a Spanish retired footballer who played as a central defender, and currently is the manager of Rayo Cantabria.

Playing career

Loza acted in the position of central defense and was trained as a footballer in the lower categories of Racing Santander and came to defend the Rayo Cantabria shirt between 1995 and 1998, with which he rose to the Second Division B of Spain with Manolo Precious on the bench.

The man from Santoñe was called up three times with the Verdiblanco first team in the First Division but he did not make his debut with the first team and later, he would play for Sociedad Deportiva Noja, Club Deportivo Logroñés, Club Deportivo Ourense, Sociedad Deportiva Ponferradina and Gimnástica de Torrelavega, the team in which he hung up his boots to begin his career on the bench.

Managerial career

In the 2013–14 season, he would coach the first team of Gimnástica de Torrelavega, with which he won Group three in 2014.

In the 2014–15 season, he signed for the Club Portugalete of the Third Division of Spain, with which he would achieve promotion to the bronze category of Spanish football after once again winning their in the Third Division and beating CF Talavera and CD Martos in the play-offs.

In the 2015–16 season, he led Club Portugalete in the Second Division B of Spain until matchday 15, where he only managed one win, seven draws and another seven losses, with the team bottom of their group.

In July 2016, Loza signed as Director of Grassroots Football for Racing Santander, where he would spend the next two seasons.

On 28 June 2018, Loza returned to Portugalete once again as manager; three years after his first spell came to an end., with whom they won their group but would fall short in the final phase of the play-offs.

In the curtailed 2019–20 season, Loza continued to lead Club Portugalete, with which he once again leads his group and would achieve promotion to the Second Division B of Spain after a five-year absence.

In the 2020–21 season, Loza was still in charge of Club Portugalete, however on 18 January 2021; after eleven rounds of league action, he was sacked.

On 17 May 2021, Loza returned to Racing Santander, but this time as manager of the second team; Rayo Cantabria for the 2021–22 season.  After guiding his side to the play-offs for the Primera Federación, where they lost to Real Murcia in the first eliminator, Loza renewed his contract until the summer of 2023.

Managerial statistics

Honours

Manager

Gimnástica
Tercera División: 2013–14

Club Portugalete
Tercera División: 2014–15
Tercera División: 2018–19
Tercera División: 2019–20

References

External links

1976 births
Living people
Spanish footballers
Association football defenders
Segunda División players
Segunda División B players
Tercera División players
SD Ponferradina players
Spanish football managers
Tercera División managers
Segunda Federación managers